Keith Brown may refer to:

Sports
Keith Brown (American football) (born 1983), American football wide receiver
Keith Brown (baseball) (born 1964), American baseball pitcher
Keith Brown (basketball), coach in 2010–11 NCAA Division I men's basketball season
Keith Brown (cricketer) (born 1963), English cricketer
Keith Brown (ice hockey) (born 1960), Canadian ice hockey player
Keith Brown (footballer, born 1954), English footballer (Grimsby Town)
Keith Brown (footballer, born 1979), Scottish footballer (Barnsley FC, Oxford United, Falkirk FC)
Keith Brown (pole vaulter) (1913–1991), American athlete and politician

Politicians
Keith Brown (Ontario politician) (1926–2015), retired businessperson and politician
Keith Brown (pole vaulter) (1913–1991), American politician and athlete
Keith Brown (Scottish politician) (born 1961), Depute Leader of the Scottish National Party (SNP) and former Scottish government minister
Keith Brown (New York politician) (born 1968), member of the New York State Assembly 
Keith L. Brown (1925–2016), American diplomat

Others
Keith Brown, former stage manager of the piano group The 5 Browns
Keith Brown (author) (born 1967), technical and security author
Keith Brown (linguist), British linguist